Hydroxycorticosteroids (OHCSs) are corticosteroids that have an additional hydroxy (-OH) group.

There are two main positions where the hydroxy group may be added: at carbon atom 11, and at carbon atom 17.

At the 11 position

11-hydroxycorticosteroids (11-OHCSs) include:

 aldosterone
 corticosterone
 hydrocortisone

At the 17 position

17-hydroxycorticosteroids (17-OHCSs) include:

 cortisone
 hydrocortisone

External links
 

Corticosteroids